Man Trouble is a 1992 American romantic black comedy film starring Jack Nicholson and Ellen Barkin. It was directed by Bob Rafelson and written by Carole Eastman, who together had been responsible for 1970's Five Easy Pieces.

The film is the fifth collaboration between Nicholson and Rafelson. Beverly D'Angelo and Harry Dean Stanton co-star.

Plot
Harry Bliss (Nicholson) runs a guard dog service and is going through counseling with his wife, Adele (Lauren Tom). A serial killer is on the loose in Los Angeles, so when the apartment of classical singer Joan Spruance (Barkin) is ransacked and she starts receiving threatening phone messages, Joan moves into the Hollywood Hills home of her sister, Andy (D'Angelo).

Joan does not feel safe there, either, because she is harassed by Andy's ex-lovers. She hires a guard dog from Harry's company, and Harry is soon providing more than protection for the beautiful singer.

Harry is a natural-born liar who, because of his profession, feels that he lives by a code of honor – even if he cannot quite explain it – as one thing after another spins out of his control. Joan is soft and vulnerable as she is badgered by her conductor husband, harassed by unknown callers, menaced by men from her sister's past, and "helped" by Harry.

Cast
 Jack Nicholson as Harry Bliss
 Ellen Barkin as Joan Spruance
 Harry Dean Stanton as Redmond Layls
 Beverly D'Angelo as Andy Ellerman
 Michael McKean as Eddy Revere
 Saul Rubinek as Laurence Moncreif
 Paul Mazursky as Lee MacGreevy
 Lauren Tom as Adele Bliss
 Viveka Davis as June Huff
 Veronica Cartwright as Helen Dextra
 David Clennon as Lewie Duart
 John Kapelos as Detective Melvenos
 Gary Graham as Butch Gable

Reception

Critical response
Man Trouble was not well received by the majority of critics. It holds a 7% rating on Rotten Tomatoes based on 30 reviews. The consensus summarizes: "Man Trouble has brilliant stars and the germ of an interesting idea in its favor, which makes the scattered, unfunny results even more of a disappointment." Audiences surveyed by CinemaScore gave the film a grade of "C" on scale of A+ to F.

The New York Times review said "Not much about "Man Trouble," a sad mess of a romantic comedy directed by Bob Rafelson, written by Carole Eastman and starring Jack Nicholson, suggests that these three collaborated on one of the most haunting and representative films of another day."

Variety'''s review said that "Jack Nicholson fans should feel cheated by Man Trouble, an insultingly trivial star vehicle. After some initial business attracted by his name on the marquee, film is fated for pay-cable use."

Film Four's review stated: "Sold on the proven teamwork of director Rafelson and actor Nicholson -- who had previously worked together on Five Easy Pieces, The King of Marvin Gardens and The Postman Always Rings Twice -- this romantic comedy proved to be one of their least inspired collaborations. Nicholson plays a grouchy dog-trainer who slowly loosens up in the presence of romantically challenged opera singer Barkin, who needs to get some canine security after a series of death threats. Obviously intended to be a bright and breezy romantic-comedy thriller, it ends up a mangy old mutt of a movie thanks to a charmless script and disastrous casting decisions."

According to Time Out magazine: "The trouble is, the film never seems to know where it's headed. Not quite a romance, a thriller or a comedy, it's a movie with an on-going identity crisis. Barkin, playing against type, produces a shrill caricature of femininity, while Rafelson indulges Nicholson's familiar soft-spoken laxity, another of his personable rogues."

Jack Nicholson earned a Golden Raspberry Award nomination for Worst Actor for his performances in both this film and Hoffa, but lost the trophy to Sylvester Stallone for Stop! Or My Mom Will Shoot.

Box office
The film opened in 1,004 theatres and grossed $2,034,475 in its opening weekend. It grossed 67% less the following weekend and was pulled from theatres shortly thereafter with a gross of only $4 million.

With a budget of $30 million, including almost $8 million paid to Nicholson, the film made a loss for Pentamerica, their second consecutive box-office bomb after Folks!''. Fox expected to recover their $8 million marketing expenses.

References

External links
 
 
 

1992 films
1992 romantic comedy films
20th Century Fox films
American black comedy films
American romantic comedy films
Films scored by Georges Delerue
Films directed by Bob Rafelson
Films set in Los Angeles
Films with screenplays by Carole Eastman
American serial killer films
1990s English-language films
1990s American films